Liga Deportiva Universitaria de Quito's 2005 season was the club's 75th year of existence, the 52nd year in professional football, and the 44th in the top level of professional football in Ecuador.

Kits
Supplier: Umbro
Sponsor(s): Movistar, Coca-Cola, Pilsener

Squad

Competitions

Serie A

Campeonato Apertura

First stage

Results

Quarterfinals

Semifinals

Finals

Campeonato Clausura

First stage

Results

Liguilla Final

Results

Copa Libertadores

Copa Libertadores Squad

First stage

Second stage

Round of 16

Copa Sudamericana

Copa Sudamericana squad

First stage

Second stage

References
2005 season on RSSSF

External links
Official Site 
LDU Quito (4) - Barcelona SC (0) 1st goal
LDU Quito (6) - Olmedo (3)
Deportivo Quito (0) - LDU Quito (4) 1st goal
Deportivo Quito (0) - LDU Quito (4) 2nd goal
LDU Quito (7) - El Nacional (0)
LDU Quito (3) - Barcelona SC (0)
LIGA DE QUITO - CAMPEON NACIONAL 2005

2005
Ldu